The Tumbes tyrant (Tumbezia salvini) is a species of bird in the family Tyrannidae. It is monotypic within the genus Tumbezia. Its range is almost entirely within Peru, but it is also found within Tumbes–Piura dry forests habitat in the extreme southwest of Ecuador. Its natural habitats are subtropical or tropical dry forest, subtropical or tropical moist lowland forest, and subtropical or tropical dry shrubland. It is threatened by habitat loss.

References

Tumbes tyrant
Birds of the Tumbes-Chocó-Magdalena
Tumbes tyrant
Tumbes tyrant
Taxonomy articles created by Polbot
Taxobox binomials not recognized by IUCN